John Richard Davey (26 August 1957 – 26 March 2021) was an Australian cricketer. He played one first-class match for South Australia in 1981/82.

See also
 List of South Australian representative cricketers

References

External links
 

1957 births
2021 deaths
Australian cricketers
South Australia cricketers
Sportspeople from Bournemouth
Cricketers from Dorset